Cayman Prep and High School (CPHS) is a private school in George Town, Grand Cayman, Cayman Islands operated and owned by the United Church in Jamaica and the Cayman Islands. It serves levels infant school through sixth-form.

Its high school programme began in 1997, and that year its current infant school on Smith Road opened.

There are separate campuses for primary and high school in George Town.

References

External links
 Cayman Prep and High School

Schools in George Town, Cayman Islands
Secondary schools in the Cayman Islands
Educational institutions established in 1949
1949 establishments in the Cayman Islands